Open Listings was an online real estate brokerage, focused exclusively on representing buyers. One of the stated goals of the company is to make homeownership more affordable for everyone by refunding 50% of their commission to the buyer at close.  As of September 2016, Open Listings has refunded homebuyers over $1M.

Founded in May 2014, Open Listings officially launched in February 2015 while participating in the Y Combinator Winter 2015 batch. The company is operational throughout California and they operate offices in Los Angeles. The company raised a $1M seed round from Soma Capital, ChinaRock Capital, I/O Ventures, Joe Montana & Liquid2 Ventures, Kevin Hale, Josh Guttman, Kevin Moore, and other angels.

The site is intended to enable home buyers to search for homes and submit offers online. Open Listings’ business model is based on generating revenue earned by representing a buyer in a real estate transaction. The company gives back 50% of the revenue they make to the buyer at close and the buyers save an average of $9,604 with their 50% commission refund.

Acquisition
Opendoor, the online real estate marketplace, announced in 2018 that it had acquired Open Listings, a platform for homebuyers.

History
Since launching in 2015 out of Y Combinator with the mission of making buying a home simple and affordable, the Los Angeles-based company has raised seed and series-A rounds with notable investors such as Matrix Partners, Initialized Capital, & Arena Ventures. Open Listings is headquartered in Los Angeles with 45 full-time employees, and over 150 local real estate agents.

Open Listings has exceeded $1B in homes bought on its platform, resulting in over $8M in savings passed along to its customers since the company launched in 2015.

As of June 2021, openlistings.com redirects to https://goodbye-ol.opendoor.com with a epitaph message (OL 2015-2019) thanking visitors for their support and directing them to opendoor.com/homes

References

External links
 Official website
 Fixer properties

Consumer guides
Companies based in San Francisco
Companies based in Los Angeles